Goeppertia roseopicta is a species of plant in the family Marantaceae, native to northwest Brazil. It is marketed as a houseplant under its synonym Calathea roseopicta. The large rounded leaves are dark green above, red below, marked heavily with cream or pink stripes "painted" along the veins and midrib, with feathered margins. 

It is tender, with a minimum temperature of  required, and in temperate areas is cultivated indoors as a houseplant. This plant has gained the Royal Horticultural Society's Award of Garden Merit as a houseplant.

References

roseopicta